Pedro Guilherme-Moreira (born 1969) is a Portuguese lawyer and novelist.

He was the one of the first lawyers to win the João Lopes Cardoso Award, and as a writer he debuted in 2011 with the novel A Manhã do Mundo (literally The Morning of the World).

Pedro Guilherme-Moreira was born in Porto in the summer of 1969 and graduated from the University of Coimbra.

In 1999, after turning 30, his article As novas tecnologias ao serviço do advogado (The new technologies serving the lawyer) was published in the "Revista da Ordem dos Advogados", the Portuguese Bar Association's magazine. For this work, Guilherme-Moreira would be one of the first to receive the João Lopes Cardoso Award, established in honor of the lawyer from Porto, by the Porto District Council of the Portuguese Bar Association. This award honors the work presented by the interns at the end of the internship, being in this case published in book in 2002, released by Almedina.

In May 2011, Guilherme-Moreira published his first book: the novel A Manhã do Mundo (literally The Morning of the World), with seal of Publicações Dom Quixote, a book based around the September 11 attacks.

References

External links
 Guilherme-Moreira's profile at blogger.com.
 Guilherme-Moreira's Channel at YouTube. (in Portuguese and English)
 Interview about the book A Manhã do Mundo by the author to Ana Daniela Ferreira on "À Volta dos Livros", at Antena 1, on 22 June 2011. (in Portuguese)
 Interview about the book A Manhã do Mundo by the author to TV show "Câmara Clara", at RTP2, on 9 September 2011. From 3 min 27 s. (in Portuguese)
 Interview about the book A Manhã do Mundo by the author to Ana Rita Clara, on TV show "Mais Mulher", at SIC Mulher, in September 2011. (in Portuguese)

1969 births
Living people
People from Porto
Portuguese male novelists
20th-century Portuguese lawyers
University of Coimbra alumni
21st-century Portuguese lawyers